The border between Canada and the United States is the longest international border in the world. The land border has two sections: Canada's border with the contiguous United States to its south, and with the U.S. state of Alaska to its west. The bi-national International Boundary Commission deals with matters relating to marking and maintaining the boundary, and the International Joint Commission deals with issues concerning boundary waters. The agencies currently responsible for facilitating legal passage through the international boundary are the Canada Border Services Agency (CBSA) and U.S. Customs and Border Protection (CBP).

History

18th century

The Treaty of Paris of 1783 ended the American Revolutionary War between Great Britain and the United States. In the second article of the Treaty, the parties agreed on all boundaries of the United States, including, but not limited to, the boundary to the north along then-British North America. The agreed-upon boundary included the line from the northwest angle of Nova Scotia to the northwesternmost head of the Connecticut River and proceeded down along the middle of the river to the 45th parallel of north latitude.

The parallel had been established in the 1760s as the boundary between the provinces of Quebec and New York (including what would later become the State of Vermont). It was surveyed and marked by John Collins and Thomas Valentine from 1771 to 1773.

The St. Lawrence River and the Great Lakes became the boundary further west, between the United States and what is now Ontario. Northwest of Lake Superior, the boundary followed rivers to the Lake of the Woods. From the northwesternmost point of the Lake of the Woods, the boundary was agreed to go straight west until it met the Mississippi River. In fact, that line never meets the river since the river's source is further south.

Jay Treaty (1794)
The Jay Treaty of 1794 (effective 1796) created the International Boundary Commission, which was charged with surveying and mapping the boundary. It also provided for the removal of British military and administration from Detroit, as well as other frontier outposts on the U.S. side. The Jay Treaty was superseded by the Treaty of Ghent (effective 1815) concluding the War of 1812, which included pre-war boundaries.

19th century

Signed in December 1814, the Treaty of Ghent ended the War of 1812, returning the boundaries of British North America and the United States to the state they were prior to the war. In the following decades, the United States and the United Kingdom concluded several treaties that settled the major boundary disputes between the two, enabling the border to be demilitarized. The Rush–Bagot Treaty of 1817 provided a plan for demilitarizing the two combatant sides in the War of 1812 and also laid out preliminary principles for drawing a border between British North America and the United States.

London Convention (1818) 
The Treaty of 1818 saw expansion of both British North America and the US, where the boundary extended westward along the 49th parallel, from the Northwest Angle at Lake of the Woods to the Rocky Mountains. The treaty extinguished British claims to the south of that line up to the Red River Valley, which was part of Rupert's Land. The treaty also extinguished U.S. claims to land north of that line in the watershed of the Missouri River, which was part of the Louisiana Purchase. This amounted to three small areas, consisting of the northern part of the drainages of the Milk River (today in southern Alberta and southwestern Saskatchewan), the Poplar River (Saskatchewan), and Big Muddy Creek (Saskatchewan). Along the 49th parallel, the border vista is theoretically straight, but in practice follows the 19th-century surveyed border markers and varies by several hundred feet in spots.

Webster–Ashburton Treaty (1842) 

Disputes over the interpretation of the border treaties and mistakes in surveying required additional negotiations, which resulted in the Webster–Ashburton Treaty of 1842. The treaty resolved the Aroostook War, a dispute over the boundary between Maine, New Brunswick, and the Province of Canada. The treaty redefined the border between New Hampshire, Vermont, and New York on the one hand, and the Province of Canada on the other, resolving the Indian Stream dispute and the Fort Blunder dilemma at the outlet to Lake Champlain.

The part of the 45th parallel that separates Quebec from the U.S. states of Vermont and New York had first been surveyed from 1771 to 1773 after it had been declared the boundary between New York (including what later became Vermont) and Quebec. It was surveyed again after the War of 1812. The U.S. federal government began to construct fortifications just south of the border at Rouses Point, New York, on Lake Champlain. After a significant portion of the construction was completed, measurements revealed that at that point, the actual 45th parallel was three-quarters of a mile (1.2 km) south of the surveyed line. The fort, which became known as "Fort Blunder", was in Canada, which created a dilemma for the U.S. that was not resolved until a provision of the treaty left the border on the meandering line as surveyed. The border along the Boundary Waters in present-day Ontario and Minnesota between Lake Superior and the Northwest Angle was also redefined.

Oregon Treaty (1846) 

An 1844 boundary dispute during the Presidency of James K. Polk led to a call for the northern boundary of the U.S. west of the Rockies to be 54°40′N related to the southern boundary of Russia's Alaska Territory. However, Great Britain wanted a border that followed the Columbia River to the Pacific Ocean. The dispute was resolved in the Oregon Treaty of 1846, which established the 49th parallel as the boundary through the Rockies.

Boundary surveys (mid–19th century) 
The Northwest Boundary Survey (1857–1861) laid out the land boundary. However, the water boundary was not settled for some time. After the Pig War in 1859, arbitration in 1872 established the border between the Gulf Islands and the San Juan Islands.

The International Boundary Survey (or, the "Northern Boundary Survey" in the US) began in 1872. Its mandate was to establish the border as agreed to in the Treaty of 1818. Archibald Campbell led the way for the United States, while Donald Cameron, supported by chief astronomer Samuel Anderson, headed the British team. This survey focused on the border from the Lake of the Woods to the summit of the Rocky Mountains.

20th century

In 1903, following a dispute that arose because of the Klondike Gold Rush, a joint United Kingdom–Canada–U.S. tribunal established the boundary of southeast Alaska.

On April 11, 1908, the United Kingdom and the United States agreed, under Article IV of the Treaty of 1908 "concerning the boundary between the United States and the Dominion of Canada from the Atlantic Ocean to the Pacific Ocean", to survey and delimit the boundary between Canada and the U.S. through the St. Lawrence River and Great Lakes, in accordance with modern surveying techniques, and thus accomplished several changes to the border.

In 1909, under the Boundary Waters Treaty, the International Joint Commission was established for Canada and the U.S. to investigate and approve projects that affect the waters and waterways along the border.

21st century
As a result of the 2001 September 11 attacks, the Canada–U.S. border was shut without any warning, and no goods or people were allowed to cross. In the wake of the impromptu border closure, procedures were jointly developed to ensure that commercial traffic could cross the border even if people were restricted from crossing. These procedures were later used for a border closure caused by the COVID-19 pandemic in 2020.

2020–2021 closure 

In response to the COVID-19 pandemic in Canada and the United States, the governments of Canada and the United States agreed to close the border to "non-essential" travel on March 21, 2020, for an initial period of 30 days. The closure has been extended 15 times since then; it expired on July 21, 2021. However, in mid-June 2021, the Canadian government announced it will ease some entry requirements for fully vaccinated Canadian nationals, permanent residents, and foreign nationals starting on July 5, 2021. In mid-July, the Canadian government announced that fully vaccinated American citizens and permanent residents can visit Canada starting August 9, 2021. The American government reopened its land border to fully vaccinated Canadian citizens effective November 8, 2021. Provided that COVID cases remain stable and/or decline, fully vaccinated international visitors can enter Canada starting September 7. The 2020–21 closure was reportedly the first blanket, long-term closure of the border since the War of 1812.

Essential travel, as defined by Canadian and US regulations, includes travel for employment or education purposes. "Non-essential" travel to Canada, includes travel "for an optional or discretionary purpose, such as tourism, recreation or entertainment." The U.S. Department of Homeland Security issued defined non-essential travel to include "tourism purposes (e.g., sightseeing, recreation, gambling, or attending cultural events)" and gave an extensive, non-exhaustive definition of what sorts of travel qualify as essential.

Business advocacy groups, noting the substantial economic impact of the closure on both sides of the border, called for more nuanced restrictions in place of the blanket ban on non-essential travel. The Northern Border Caucus, a group in the US Congress composed of members from border communities, made similar suggestions to the governments of both countries. Beyond the closure itself, US President Donald Trump also initially suggested the idea of deploying United States military personnel near the border with Canada in connection with the pandemic. He later abandoned the idea following vocal opposition from Canadian officials.

Security

Law enforcement approach 
The International Boundary is commonly referred to as the world's "longest undefended border", though this is true only in the military sense, as civilian law enforcement is present. It is illegal to cross the border outside border controls, as anyone crossing the border must be checked per immigration and customs laws. The relatively low level of security measures stands in contrast to that of the United States–Mexico border (one-third length of Canada–U.S. border), which is actively patrolled by U.S. Customs and Border Protection personnel to prevent illegal migration and drug trafficking.

Parts of the International Boundary cross through mountainous terrain or heavily forested areas, but significant portions also cross remote prairie farmland and the Great Lakes and Saint Lawrence River, in addition to the maritime components of the boundary at the Atlantic, Pacific, and Arctic oceans. The border also runs through the middle of the Akwesasne Nation and even divides some buildings found in communities in New England and Quebec.

The U.S. Customs and Border Protection (CBP) identifies the chief issues along the border as domestic and international terrorism; drug smuggling and smuggling of products (such as tobacco) to evade customs duties; and illegal immigration. A June 2019 U.S. Government Accountability Office report identified specific staffing and resource shortfalls faced by the CBP on the Northern border that adversely affect enforcement actions; the U.S. Border Patrol "identified an insufficient number of agents that limited patrol missions along the northern border" while CBP Air and Marine Operations "identified an insufficient number of agents along the northern border, which limited the number and frequency of air and maritime missions."

There are eight U.S. Border Patrol sectors based on the Canada–U.S. border, each covering a designated "area of responsibility"; the sectors are (from west to east) based in Blaine, Washington; Spokane, Washington; Havre, Montana; Grand Forks, North Dakota; Detroit, Michigan; Buffalo, New York; Swanton, Vermont; and Houlton, Maine.

Following the September 11 attacks in the United States, security along the border was dramatically tightened by the two countries in both populated and rural areas. Both nations are also actively involved in detailed and extensive tactical and strategic intelligence sharing.

In December 2010, Canada and the United States were negotiating an agreement titled "Beyond the Border: A Shared Vision for Perimeter Security and Competitiveness" which would give the U.S. more influence over Canada's border security and immigration controls, and more information would be shared by Canada with the U.S.

Security measures 

Residents of both nations who own property adjacent to the border are forbidden to build within the  boundary vista without permission from the International Boundary Commission. They are required to report such construction to their respective governments.

All persons crossing the border are required to report to the customs agency of the country they have entered. Where necessary, fences or vehicle blockades are used. In remote areas, where staffed border crossings are not available, there are hidden sensors on roads, trails, railways, and wooded areas, which are located near crossing points. There is no border zone; the U.S. Customs and Border Protection routinely sets up checkpoints as far as  into U.S. territory.

In August 2020, the United States constructed  of short cable fencing along the border between Abbotsford, British Columbia, and Whatcom County, Washington.

Identification 

Prior to 2007, American and Canadian citizens were only required to produce a birth certificate and driver's license/government-issued identification card when crossing the Canada–United States border.

However, in late 2006, the U.S. Department of Homeland Security (DHS) announced the final rule of the Western Hemisphere Travel Initiative (WHTI), which pertained to new identification requirements for travelers entering the United States. This rule, which marked the first phase of the initiative, was implemented on January 23, 2007, specifying six forms of identification acceptable for crossing the U.S. border (depending on mode):

 a valid passport—required in order to enter by air;
 a United States Passport Card;
 a state enhanced driver's license—available in the States of Michigan, Minnesota, New York, Vermont, Washington, as well as in the provinces of British Columbia, Manitoba, Ontario, and Quebec;
 a trusted traveler program card (i.e. NEXUS, FAST, or SENTRI); 
 a valid Merchant Mariner Credential—to be used when traveling in conjunction with official maritime business; and
 a valid U.S. military identification card—to be used when traveling on official orders.

The requirement of a passport or an enhanced form of identification to enter the United States by air went into effect in January 2007; and went into effect for those entering the U.S. by land and sea in January 2008. Although the new requirements for land and sea entry went into legal effect in January 2008, its enforcement did not begin until June 2009. Since June 2009, every traveller arriving via a land or sea port-of-entry (including ferries) has been required to present one of the above forms of identification in order to enter the United States.

Conversely in order to cross into Canada, a traveler must also carry identification, as well as a valid visa (if necessary) when crossing the border. Forms of identification include a valid passport, a Canadian Emergency Travel Document, an enhanced driver's license issued by a Canadian province or territory, or an enhanced identification/photo card issued by a Canadian province or territory. Several other documents may be used by Canadians to identify their citizenship at the border, although use of such documents requires it to be supported with additional photo identification.

American and Canadian citizens who are members of a trusted traveler program such as FAST or NEXUS, may present their FAST or NEXUS card as an alternate form of identification when crossing the international boundary by land or sea, or when arriving by air from only Canada or the United States. Although permanent residents of Canada and the United States are eligible for FAST or NEXUS, they are required to travel with a passport and proof of permanent residency upon arrival at the Canadian border. American permanent residents who are NEXUS members also require Electronic Travel Authorization when crossing the Canadian border.

Security issues

Smuggling 

Smuggling of alcoholic beverages ("rum running") was widespread during the 1920s, when Prohibition was in effect nationally in the United States and parts of Canada.

In more recent years, Canadian officials have brought attention to drug, cigarette, and firearms smuggling from the United States, while U.S. officials have made complaints of drug smuggling via Canada. In July 2005, law enforcement personnel arrested three men who had built a  tunnel under the border between British Columbia and Washington, intended for the use of smuggling marijuana, the first such tunnel known on this border. From 2007 to 2010, 147 people were arrested for smuggling marijuana on the property of a bed-and-breakfast in Blaine, Washington, but agents estimate that they caught only about 5% of smugglers.

Because of its location, Cornwall, Ontario, experiences ongoing smuggling—mostly of tobacco and firearms from the United States. The neighboring Mohawk territory of Akwesasne straddles the Ontario–Quebec–New York borders, where its First Nations sovereignty prevents Ontario Provincial Police, Sûreté du Québec, Royal Canadian Mounted Police, Canada Border Services Agency, Canadian Coast Guard, United States Border Patrol, United States Coast Guard, and New York State Police from exercising jurisdiction over exchanges taking place within the territory.

2009 border occupation 
In May 2009, the Mohawk people of Akwesasne occupied the area around the Canada Border Services Agency port of entry building to protest the Canadian government's decision to arm its border agents while operating on Mohawk territory.  The north span of the Seaway International Bridge  and the CBSA inspection facilities were closed.  During this occupation, the Canadian flag was replaced with the flag of the Mohawk people. Although U.S. Customs remained opened to southbound traffic, northbound traffic was blocked on the U.S. side by both American and Canadian officials. The Canadian border at this crossing remained closed for six weeks.  On July 13, 2009, the CBSA opened a temporary inspection station at the north end of the north span of the bridge in the city of Cornwall, allowing traffic to once again flow in both directions.

The Mohawk people of Akwesasne have staged ongoing protests at this border.  In 2014 they objected to a process that made their crossing more tedious, believing it violated their treaty rights of free passage.  When traveling from the U.S. to Cornwall Island, they must first cross a second bridge into Canada, for inspection at the new Canadian border station. Discussions between inter-governmental agencies were being pursued on the feasibility of relocating the Canadian border inspection facilities on the U.S. side of the border.

2017 border crossing crisis 

In August 2017, the border between Quebec and New York saw an influx of up to 500 irregular crossings each day, by individuals seeking asylum in Canada. As a result, Canada increased border security and immigration staffing in the area, reiterating the fact that crossing the border irregularly had no effect on one's asylum status.

From the beginning of January 2017 up until the end of March 2018, the RCMP intercepted 25,645 people crossing the border into Canada from an unauthorized point of entry. Public Safety Canada estimates another 2,500 came across in April 2018 for a total of just over 28,000.

Border lengths and regions 

Eight out of thirteen provinces and territories of Canada and thirteen out of fifty U.S. states are located along this international boundary.

Yukon 
At 60°18′N, the border proceeds away from the 141st meridian west in a southeastward direction, following the St. Elias Mountains. South of the 60th parallel north, the border continues into British Columbia.

British Columbia 

British Columbia has two international borders with the United States: with the state of Alaska along BC's northwest, and with the contiguous United States along the southern edge of the province, including (west to east) Washington, Idaho, and Montana.

At , the border begins a general southeastward direction along the Coast Mountains. The border eventually reaches the Portland Canal and follows it outward to the Dixon Entrance, which takes the border down and out into the Pacific Ocean, terminating it upon reaching international waters.

BC's border along the contiguous U.S. begins southwest of Vancouver Island and northwest of the Olympic Peninsula, at the terminus of international waters in the Pacific Ocean. It follows the Strait of Juan de Fuca eastward, turning northeastward to enter Haro Strait. The border follows the strait in a northward direction, but turns sharply eastward through Boundary Pass, separating the Canadian Gulf Islands from the American San Juan Islands. Upon reaching the Strait of Georgia, the border turns due north and then towards the northwest, bisecting the strait until the 49th parallel north. After making a sharp turn eastbound, the border follows this parallel across the Tsawwassen Peninsula, separating Point Roberts, Washington from Delta, British Columbia, and continues into Alberta.

Prairies 

The entire Canada–U.S. border in the provinces of both Alberta and Saskatchewan lie on the 49th parallel north. Both provinces share borders with the state of Montana, while, farther east, Saskatchewan also shares a border with North Dakota.

Along with the U.S. states of North Dakota and Minnesota (west to east), nearly the entire Canada–U.S. border in Manitoba lies on the 49th parallel north. At the province's eastern end, however, the border briefly enters the Lake of the Woods, turning north at  where it continues into land along the western end of Minnesota's Northwest Angle, the only part of the United States besides the state of Alaska that is north of the 49th parallel.

Ontario 

The province of Ontario shares its border (west to east) with the U.S. states of Minnesota, Michigan, Ohio, Pennsylvania, and New York. The largest provincial international border, most of the border is a water boundary. It begins at the north-westernmost point of Minnesota's Northwest Angle. From here, it proceeds eastward through the Angle Inlet into the Lake of the Woods, turning southward at  where it continues into the Rainy River. The border follows the River to Rainy Lake, then subsequently through various smaller lakes, including Namakan Lake, Lac la Croix, and Sea Gull Lake, until it reaches the Pigeon River, which leads it out into Lake Superior. The border continues through Lake Superior and Whitefish Bay, into the St. Mary's River then the North Channel. At , the border turns southward into the False Detour Channel, from which it reaches Lake Huron. Through the Lake, the border heads southward until reaching the St. Clair River, leading it to Lake St. Clair. The border proceeds through Lake St. Clair, reaching the Detroit River, which leads it to Lake Erie. From Lake Erie the border is led into the Niagara River, which takes it into Lake Ontario. From here, the boundary heads northwestward until it reaches , where it makes a sharp turn towards the northeast.

Quebec 
The province of Quebec borders (west to east) the U.S. states of New York, Vermont, New Hampshire, and Maine, beginning where the Ontario-New York border ends in the St. Lawrence River at the 45th parallel north. This border heads inland towards the east, remaining on or near the parallel.

New Brunswick 
The border proceeds through the St. Croix to Passamaquoddy Bay, which then leads it to Grand Manan Island into the middle of the Bay of Fundy. Here, the border turns towards the south and terminates upon reaching international waters.

Crossings and border straddling

Airports 

The U.S. maintains pre-clearance facilities (i.e. immigration offices) at eight Canadian airports with international air service to the United States: Calgary; Edmonton; Halifax Stanfield; Montreal–Trudeau; Ottawa Macdonald–Cartier; Toronto Island Airport (Billy Bishop Airport), Toronto–Pearson, Vancouver; and Winnipeg James Armstrong Richardson. These procedures expedite travel by allowing flights originating in Canada to land at a U.S. airport without being processed as an international arrival. Canada does not maintain equivalent personnel at U.S. airports due to the sheer number of Canada-bound flights from numerous U.S. departure locations.

Cross-border airports
One curiosity on the Canada–U.S. border is the presence of six airports and eleven seaplane bases whose runways straddle the borderline. Such airports were built prior to the U.S. entry into World War II as a way to legally transfer U.S.-built aircraft, such as the Lockheed Hudson, to Canada under the provisions of the Lend-Lease Act. In the interest of maintaining neutrality, U.S. military pilots were forbidden to deliver combat aircraft to Canada. As result, the aircraft were flown to the border, where they landed, then were towed on their wheels over the border by tractors or horses overnight. The next day, the planes were crewed by RCAF pilots and flown to other locations, typically airbases in Eastern Canada and Newfoundland, from where they were flown to the United Kingdom and deployed in the Battle of Britain.

Piney Pinecreek Border Airport is located in Piney, Manitoba and Pinecreek, Minnesota. The northwest–southeast-oriented runway straddles the border, and there are two ramps: one in the U.S. and one in Canada. The airport is owned by the Minnesota Department of Transportation.

International Peace Garden Airport is located in Boissevain, Manitoba and Dunseith, North Dakota adjacent to the International Peace Garden. The runway is entirely within North Dakota, but a ramp extends across the border to allow aircraft to access Canadian customs. While not jointly owned, it is operated as an international facility for customs clearance as part of the Peace Garden.

Coronach/Scobey Border Station Airport (or East Poplar Airport) is located in Coronach, Saskatchewan and Scobey, Montana. The airport is jointly owned by the Canadian and U.S. government, with its east–west runway sited exactly on the borderline.

Coutts/Ross International Airport is located in Alberta and Montana. Like Coronach/Scobey, the east–west runway is sited exactly on the border. The airport is owned entirely by the Montana Department of Transportation (DOT) Aeronautics Division.

Del Bonita/Whetstone International Airport, located in Del Bonita, Alberta and Del Bonita, Montana, has an east–west runway sited exactly on the border, similar to Coutts/Ross. The airport is officially owned by the state of Montana and run by the state's DOT Aeronautics Division, thus it has been assigned a U.S. identifier only. The facility is set up for both the general public (15 passengers maximum per plane) as well as the American military.

Avey Field State Airport is located in Washington and British Columbia. The privately owned airfield is mostly in the U.S., but several hundred feet of the north–south runway extend into Canada. As such, both Canadian and U.S. customs are available. It is assigned a U.S. identifier, but does not have a Canadian one.

Several seaplane bases have water runways that cross the border, though the extent to which they do may be difficult to ascertain. The land-based facilities for the bases are all contained within one country or the other, however, leading to multiple situations where twin seaplane bases may share the same body of water. The following seaplane facilities exist on the border:

 Rouses Point SPB (New York / Quebec)
 Van Buren SPB (Maine / New Brunswick)
 Sault Ste Marie SPB and Sault Ste. Marie Water Aerodrome (Michigan / Ontario)
 Sand Point Lake Water Aerodrome (Minnesota / Ontario)
 International Falls SPB and Fort Frances Water Aerodrome (Minnesota / Ontario)
 Baudette International Airport and Rainy River Water Aerodrome (Minnesota / Ontario)
 Hyder Seaplane Base and Stewart Water Aerodrome (Alaska / British Columbia)

Land border crossings

Currently there are 119 legal land border crossings between the United States and Canada, 26 of which take place at a bridge or tunnel. Only 2 of the 119 crossings are one-way: the Churubusco–Franklin Centre Border Crossing, where travelers may enter only the United States; and the Four Falls Border Crossing, where travelers may enter only Canada.

There are six roads that have unstaffed road crossings, and do not have border inspection services in one or both directions, where travelers are legally allowed to cross the border. Those that cross are required to report to customs, which are stationed farther within.

Trail crossings 
The Fourth Connecticut Lake Trail (New Hampshire/Quebec) crosses several times while following the border vista before heading back to the United States.

Rail crossings 
There are 39 railroads that cross the U.S.–Canada border, nine of which are no longer in use. Eleven of these railroads cross the border at a bridge or tunnel.

Only three international rail lines currently carry passengers between the U.S. and Canada. At Vancouver's Pacific Central Station, passengers are required to pass through U.S. partial pre-clearance and pass their baggage through an X-ray machine before being allowed to board the Seattle-bound Amtrak Cascades train, which makes no further stops before crossing the border at Blaine, Washington, where the train stops for another CBP inspection. Pre-clearance facilities are not available for the popular Adirondack (New York City to Montreal) or Maple Leaf (New York City to Toronto) trains, since these lines have stops between Montreal or Toronto and the border. Instead, passengers must clear customs at a stop located at the actual border.

Seaports 

There are 13 international ferry crossings operating between the U.S. and Canada. Two of them carry passengers only and one carries only rail cars.  Four of the ferries operate only on a seasonal basis.

Similar to that of the pre-clearance facilities at Canadian airports, arrangements exist at major Canadian seaports that handle sealed direct import shipments into the U.S. Along the East coast, ferry services operate between the province of New Brunswick and the state of Maine, while on the West coast, they operate between British Columbia and the states of Washington and Alaska. There are also several ferry services in the Great Lakes operating between the province of Ontario and the states of Michigan, New York, and Ohio. The ferry between Maine and Nova Scotia ended its operations in 2009, resuming again in 2014.

On Heart Island in the St. Lawrence River, the Boldt Castle has a border control point with no specific location on the Canadian side. As such, Canadians must present identification to land on the island.

Cross-border buildings 

A line house is a building located so that an international boundary passes through it. There are several such buildings that exist along the U.S.–Canada border:

 The Haskell Free Library and Opera House straddles the border in Derby Line, Vermont, and Stanstead, Quebec. 
 Private homes divided by the boundary line between Estcourt Station, Maine, and Pohénégamook, Quebec.
 Private homes divided between Beebe Plain, Quebec and Beebe Plain, Vermont; 
 A seasonal home divided at the intersection of Matthias Lane in Alburgh, Vermont, and Chemin au Bord de l'Eau in Noyan, Quebec; 
 A house divided between Richford, Vermont, and Abercorn, Quebec. 
 The Halfway House (also known as Taillon's International Hotel) is a tavern, built in 1820 before the border was surveyed, that straddles the border between Dundee, Quebec, and Fort Covington, New York.

The Maine–New Brunswick border divides the Aroostook Valley Country Club.

Boundary divisions

Practical exclaves 
To be a true international exclave, all potential paths of travel from the exclave to the home country must cross over only the territory of a different country or countries. Like exclaves, practical exclaves are not contiguous with the land of the home country and have land access only through another country or countries. Unlike exclaves, they are not entirely surrounded by foreign territory. Hence, they are exclaves for practical purposes, without meeting the strict definition.

The term pene-exclave, also known as a "functional" or "practical" exclave, was defined by G. W. S. Robinson (1959) as "parts of the territory of one country that can be approached conveniently — in particular by wheeled traffic — only through the territory of another country." Thus, a pene-exclave has land borders with other territory but is not completely surrounded by the other's land or territorial waters. Catudal (1974) and Vinokurov (2007) provide examples to further elaborate, including Point Roberts, Washington: "Although physical connections by water with Point Roberts are entirely within the sovereignty of the United States, land access is only possible through Canada." Practical exclaves can exhibit continuity of state territory across territorial waters but, nevertheless, a discontinuity on land, such as in the case of Point Roberts.

Practical exclaves of Canada 

The Quebec western portion of the Akwesasne reserve is a practical exclave of Canada because of the St. Lawrence River to the north, the St. Regis River to the east, New York State, U.S. to the south. To travel by land to elsewhere in Canada, one must drive through New York State.

Campobello Island is another practical exclave located at the entrance to Passamaquoddy Bay, adjacent to the entrance to Cobscook Bay, and within the Bay of Fundy. The island is part of Charlotte County, New Brunswick, but is actually physically connected by the Franklin Delano Roosevelt Bridge with Lubec, Maine, the easternmost tip of the continental United States.

Premier, British Columbia is an abandoned mining site accessible only through Hyder, Alaska.

Practical exclaves of the United States 
Alaska is a non-contiguous U.S. state bounded by the Bering Sea; the Arctic and Pacific oceans; and Canada's British Columbia and Yukon Territory. Additionally, because of the terrain, several municipalities in southeast Alaska (the "Panhandle") are inaccessible by road, except via Canada. Specifically, the town of Hyder, Alaska, is accessible only through Stewart, British Columbia, or by floatplane. Moreover, Haines and Skagway are accessible by road only through Canada, although there are car ferries which connect them to other Alaskan places.

Point Roberts, Washington is bounded by British Columbia, the Strait of Georgia, and Boundary Bay.

In Minnesota, Elm Point, two small pieces of land to its west (Buffalo Bay Point), and the Northwest Angle are bounded by the province of Manitoba and Lake of the Woods.

In Vermont, the Alburgh Tongue, as well as Province Point, which is the small end of a peninsula east of Alburgh, are bounded by Quebec and Lake Champlain.

Split features 
Between Quebec and Vermont, Province Island is a piece of land that primarily lies in Canada, though a small portion of the island is situated in the U.S. state, lying south of the 45th parallel with a border vista marking the international boundary.

Canusa Street in Beebe Plain, VT is the only portion of the Canada–United States border split down the middle of a street.

Between North Dakota and Manitoba, the international border splits a peninsula within a lake on the border of Rolette County, North Dakota, and the Wakopa Wildlife Management Area, MB. Likewise, Lake Metigoshe, lying in the Township of Roland, borders the municipality of Winchester, Manitoba. The border splits a shoreline, putting Canadian cabins on one side and the beach and boat docks for those cabins on the U.S. side, while land access is only through Canada.

Remaining boundary disputes 

 Machias Seal Island and North Rock (Maine / New Brunswick)
 Dixon Entrance (Alaska / British Columbia)
 Beaufort Sea (Alaska / Yukon)
 Strait of Juan de Fuca (Washington / British Columbia)

See also 
Canada Border Services Agency
United States Customs and Border Protection
United States Border Patrol interior checkpoints
 Canada–United States relations
 Illegal immigration to Canada
 Illegal immigration to the United States
 Indian barrier state, British plans to set up a new country in the Old Northwest
 John Lewis Tiarks, a British surveyor of the border
 Joseph Smith Harris' account of the Northwest Boundary Survey
 Mexico–United States border

Footnotes

References

Citations

Further reading 
 Anderson, Christopher G. 2012. Canadian Liberalism and the Politics of Border Control, 1867–1967. Vancouver: University of British Columbia Press. Studies pivotal episodes in Canadian immigration policy that shed light on more restrictive approaches today.
Hunt, Courtney. 2008. Frozen River. edited by Kate Williams. US: Sony Pictures Classics. A feature film about smuggling across the border
 Paulus, Jeremy, and Ali Asgary. 2010. "Enhancing Border Security: Local Values and Preferences at the Blue Water Bridge (Point Edward, Canada)." Journal of Homeland Security and Emergency Management 7(1): article 77.
University of Kent. 2015. Culture and the Canada–US Border, funded by Leverhulme Trust. An international research network dedicated to studying cultural representation, production and exchange on and around the Canada–US border.

External links 

 International Boundary Commission

 
Borders of Canada
Borders of the United States
Canada–United States relations
International borders